Lungisa Dikana, (18 December 1978 – 3 December 2014), was a South African recording artist and vocalist. Her music career shot to limelight in 2008 following the release of her debut album My Diary, My Thoughts. She died on 3 December 2014 after a short illness.

Life and career
Born into a musical family in Kwazakhele, a small town in Eastern Cape, Port Elizabeth, Lulu began singing as a chorister in her local church at the age of 15. Her father, Vuyiselie Dikana was a drummer for a band known as "Black Slave and the Flamingo". An alumna of Fort Hare University where she studied Law, Lulu released her debut album titled My Diary, My Thoughts in 2008 produced by Nigerian-born music producer Wilson Joel .  The album contained hit tracks like "Real Love" and "Life and Death".

Following the success of her debut album, Lulu began working on her second album This Is the Life. The album was released in 2011 and went on to be nominated in three categories at the 2013 Metro FM Music Awards and "Best R&B/Soul/Reggae Album" category at the 19th South African Music Awards. In October 2014, she released I Came To Love, her third studio album which earned her three nomination spots at the 21st South African Music Awards.

Death
In 2009, Lulu was diagnosed of oesophageal perforation and underwent five oesophagus operations. On 3 December 2014, she died in a hospital in South Africa after a short illness.

Discography

 My Diary, My Thoughts
 This Is The Life
 I Came to Love

Awards and nominations

Personal life
Until her death, Lulu was a born-again Christian and devoted to God. She was committed to the works of God and took going to church serious.  She is the older sister of Zonke, a South African singer-songwriter and record producer. She had a son before her death.

References

1978 births
2014 deaths
21st-century South African women singers
People from the Eastern Cape
South African rhythm and blues musicians
South African pop singers